Phacidium infestans is a fungal plant pathogen infecting Douglas-firs commonly known as snow/needle blight.

References

External links 
 Index Fungorum
 USDA ARS Fungal Database

Fungal tree pathogens and diseases
Helotiales